Yudo may refer to:

People
 Kushedya Hari Yudo (born 1993), Indonesian professional football player
 Siswono Yudo Husodo (born 1943), Indonesian politician and businessman
 Yudo Margono (born 1965), Indonesian Navy admiral

Other uses
 Yudo Auto, a Chinese electric vehicle marque by Fujian Motors Group
 Yudo, Tibet, China
 "Yudo", the Korean pronunciation of Judo

See also
 Yuda (disambiguation)